The New Huber Traction engine company of Marion, Ohio, (founded in 1854) built engines from 185 to 1903.

Huber was acquired by A-T-O in 1977, and the Huber Division was sold Enterprise Fabricators in 1994, who relocated it to Galion, Ohio. Production ceased after 2002. The Huber intellectual property was acquired by Product Acquisition and Integration Services. Huber Maintainer is now back in production with the introduction of the M-850-E Maintainer in 2021.

See also
Edward Huber
Marion Power Shovel

References

Engine manufacturers of the United States
Companies based in Ohio